The Red Sea roughy (Hoplostethus marisrubri) is a slimehead of the order Beryciformes. It can reach sizes of up to  SL. The species is known from only five specimens.

References

External links
 

Hoplostethus
Fish described in 1986
Fish of the Indian Ocean